FFC may refer to:

Government 
 Full Faith and Credit Clause, of the United States Constitution
 Flood Forecasting Centre (UK)
 Film Finance Corporation Australia, a defunct agency of the Australian government
 Federal Flood Commission, an agency of the Pakistani government

Science and technology 
 FFC Cambridge process, an electrochemical process
 Flat-field correction
 Flexible flat cable
 Front-facing camera
 Fee-for-carriage, in Canada

Sports

Association football 
 Falkirk F.C., Scotland
 Farsley F.C., England
 Farnborough F.C., England
 Floriana F.C., Malta
 Floridians FC, United States
 Fluminense Football Club, Brazilian
 Foadan FC, Togo
 Fredericksburg FC, United States
 Freiburger FC, Germany
 Fulham F.C., England
 Football Fans Census, a British fan forum
 Football Federation of Cambodia
 Football Federation of Chile

Australian rules football 
 Frematioal Football Club
 Fitzroy Football Club
 Fremantle Football Club
 Footscray Football Club, now the Western Bulldogs

Other sports 
 Freedom Football Conference, a defunct American college athletic conference
 French Cycling Federation
 Final Fight Championship, a European martial arts promotion company

Other uses 
 FF Communications (or ), a folkloristics journal
 FF.C, a Greek hip hop band
 Atlanta Regional Airport, in Georgia, United States
 Fairfield County, Connecticut, United States
 Faith and Freedom Coalition, a Christian Right organization in the U.S.
 Fauji Fertilizer Company Limited, a Pakistani fertilizer manufacturer
 Final Fantasy Chronicles, a video game compilation
 First flight cover, mail that has been carried on an inaugural flight of an airline, route, or aircraft
 Flaherty & Crumrine Preferred Securities Income Fund Inc., a company listed on the New York Stock Exchange
 Flav's Fried Chicken, a defunct American restaurant
 Forces of Freedom and Change alliance, an alliance of Sudanese coalitions of groups created in 2019
 Foundation For Children, a Thai non-profit organization
 Fulton Financial Corporation, an American financial services company